Folklore is the second studio album by Canadian singer-songwriter Nelly Furtado. It was released on 5 November 2003 through DreamWorks Records. While the album did not match the success of her previous album in such markets as the United States and Australia, it did however become a success in several European countries. Folklore spawned five singles: "Powerless (Say What You Want)", "Try", "Força", "Explode" and "The Grass Is Green". The album has sold 2 million copies worldwide.

Primarily a world and pop rock album, Folklore also incorporates ethnic, pop, folk, alternative pop and worldbeat elements.

Background
The album's title was influenced by Furtado's parents' immigration to Canada, "When I look at my old photo albums, I see pictures of their brand-new house, their shiny new car, their first experiences going to very North American-type places like Kmart. When you have that in your blood, you never really part with it it becomes your own personal folklore." Furtado attributed the mellowness of the album to the fact that she was pregnant during most of its recording. "Saturdays" features vocals by Jarvis Church and "Island of Wonder" features vocals by Caetano Veloso.

Folklore includes the single "Força" (meaning "carry on" or "strength" in Portuguese), which was written as the official anthem of the UEFA Euro 2004. Furtado performed the song at the championship's final in Lisbon, in July 2004.  Other singles included the ballad "Try" and "Powerless (Say What You Want)", in which she embraces her Portuguese heritage; the song deals with "the idea that you can still feel like a minority inside, even if you don't look like one on the outside". Additional singles were released in certain territories; "Explode" in Canada and Europe, and "The Grass Is Green" in Germany.

Critical reception

Folklore received mixed reviews from critics. AllMusic's Stephen Thomas Erlewine stated that "[w]hile there are some interesting musical moments on Folklore -- enough to make it worth a listen -- the dogged seriousness and didactic worldview become a bit overbearing not long before the album is a quarter of the way finished, particularly since the fusion of worldbeat and adult alternative pop often seems heavy-handed." Entertainment Weekly gave a positive review stating that "exultant music goes on its merry, multicultural way". While Rolling Stone gave a negative review, calling Folklore "slick, multicultural hodgepodge" but "without a single as good as 'I'm Like a Bird'." As she focused more on the songwriting, rather "than on frenetically switching genres five times in one song", BBC felt that it had "twice the originality" of her debut. The A.V. Club wrote that while "few tracks on Folklore stand out, the album hangs together agreeably..."

Commercial performance
The album debuted at number eighteen on the Canadian Albums Chart with first-week sales of 10,400, and at number thirty-eight on the US Billboard 200 chart, selling 68,000 in its first week. According to Nielsen SoundScan, it had sold 425,000 copies in the US by August 2008. It was not as successful as Furtado's debut album, Whoa, Nelly! (2000), partly because of troubles at DreamWorks Records and the less poppy sound. It lacked promotion because DreamWorks was sold to Universal Music Group at the time of Folklore'''s release, and it spent only eleven weeks on the US Billboard 200 chart. In 2005, DreamWorks Records was shut down and many of its artists, including Furtado, were absorbed into Geffen Records. Furtado noticed that the album was particularly successful in Germany, where it reached the top 5 on the albums chart, and said, "Why do Germans love this album? I think I figured it out: It's so cerebral. It's great in its own way, but that's a different side."

Track listing
All tracks produced by Nelly Furtado, Gerald Eaton and Brian West, except for "The Grass Is Green" which is produced by Furtado and Mike Elizondo and "Island of Wonder" which is produced by Furtado, Lil' Jaz, Eaton and West.

Samples
"Powerless (Say What You Want)" contains elements from "Buffalo Gals" by Malcolm McLaren.
"Island of Wonder" contains elements from "Tonada de Luna Llena" by Caetano Veloso.

Personnel
Credits adapted from the Folklore'' liner notes.

Nelly Furtado: lead and background vocals, lyricist, songwriting, acoustic guitar
Caetano Veloso: lead and background vocals (11)
Gerald Eaton a.k.a. Jarvis Church: electric harmonium (right hand), tambourine, B3 organ, background vocals
Brian West: acoustic guitar, flange guitar, electric harmonium (left hand), squeaky organ, rhythm guitar, telecaster, stadium guitar, space echo guitar, electric mantra guitar, pedals, Rhodes
George Doerling: Banjo, mandolín, cavaquinho, dulcimer, Hawaiian mini-guitar.
Russ Miller: percussion, drums
David Harrington: violin (1)
John Sherba: violin (1)
Hank Dutt: viola (1)
Jennifer Culp: cello (1)
Stephen Prutsman: string arrangement
Steve Carnelli: banjo, mandolín
James Bryan: acoustic guitar, electric guitar, island guitar, tender rogue guitar
Mike Elizondo: echoplex slide guitar, bass
Michael Einziger: lead guitar, drill guitar, chime guitar
Brad Haehnhel: fireworks display
Joey Waronker: drums
Bob Leatherbarrow: vibraphone
Alex Alessandroni: piano, echo harmonium
Jasper Gahunia a.k.a. “Lil’ Jaz”: scratching, scratch effects, subliminal speeches
Justin Meldal-Johnsen: Ocean bass
Alan Molnar: vibraphone
Béla Fleck: banjo
Gurpreet Chana: tabla
Dean Jarvis: bass
Luis Simãõ: accordion
Daniel Stone: percussion, Shakere, Caxixi, finger cymbals, cajon, congas, chascarra de gaita
Jef Ten Kortenaar: violin
David Wadly: violin
Amanda Goodburn: viola
Orly Bitou: cello
David Campbell: arranger
Mike Fratantuno: upright bass
Jon Levine: piano
Rafael Gomez: acostic guitar, Portuguese shout outs
Manuela Furtado: whistling
Kyle Erwin: Huge organ, chimes, 64-foot pipes
Vonette Yanaglmnuma: harp

Production

Nelly Furtado: producer
Track: producer, programming
Field: producer, programming, engineering
Lil’ Jazz: producer, programming, additional engineering
Mike Elizondo: producer, programming
Brad Haehnhel: mixing, engineering
Joseph Lobato: engineering
Adam Hawkins: engineering
Marcelo Sabola: engineering
Steve Chahley: assistant engineering
Ian Bodzasi: assistant engineering
Chris Gordon: assistant engineering
Neil Couser: assistant engineering
Brian Gardner: mastering
Bernie Grundman: mastering
Beth Halper: A&R
Jennifer Ross: A&R coordinator
Frances Pennington: creative director
Gravis Inc.: art direction, design
Warrick Saint: cover photo
Isabel Snyder: photography

Charts

Weekly charts

Year-end charts

Certifications

Release history

References

2003 albums
Nelly Furtado albums
Albums produced by Mike Elizondo
Albums recorded at Metalworks Studios
DreamWorks Records albums
Interscope Geffen A&M Records albums
Festival Records albums
Mushroom Records albums
Warner Records albums
World music albums by Canadian artists